Movie... In Your Face is a 1990 comedy film, mostly consisting of a redubbed Hong Kong movie.

In the style of movies like What's Up, Tiger Lily?, this movie was "produced" by replacing the original sound track of a 1984 Hong Kong movie — Ma hou pao or Crazy Kung Fu Master — with an English language sound track written to make the movie into a feature-length farce. Stand-up comic Tommy Sledge narrates the movie in his usual "hard-boiled detective" persona.

Plot
A group of Japanese gangsters overrun a movie studio to decide whether or not they want to buy it. Before they can buy it, however, they have to wait until after the studio's elderly owner dies.

Availability
This movie has been released on VHS videocassette, but not on DVD.

References

External links 
 
 

1990 films
1990 comedy films
1990s parody films
1990s English-language films